Homalocantha melanamathos is a species of sea snail, a marine gastropod mollusk in the family Muricidae, the murex snails or rock snails.

References

Homalocantha
Gastropods described in 1791